John Anderson (19 October 1913 – 17 September 1984) was a New Zealand rugby league footballer who represented New Zealand.

Playing career
Anderson originally played for Blackball in the West Coast Rugby League competition. He represented the West Coast, Canterbury and the South Island.

Auckland and Marist
In 1936 Anderson moved to Auckland, joining the Marist Old Boys club  and becoming the club captain. With Marist he won the 1938 Fox Memorial championship and the Roope Rooster in 1937 and 1939. Anderson also represented Auckland and the North Island.

In 1938 Anderson toured Australia with the New Zealand team. No test matches were played on the tour however Anderson was the second highest point scorer with 6 tries and 27 goals.

Anderson was one of the most prolific point scorers in Auckland rugby league history.

Army rugby
During the war years Anderson played rugby for an Army side.

Point Chevalier
In 1944 Anderson transferred to the Point Chevalier club during the second round of the competition not having played in the league for 3 seasons. He scored a try in a loss to Ponsonby on July 29 and then soon after requested a transfer back to his old Marist club.

References

1913 births
1984 deaths
Auckland rugby league team players
Blackball players
Canterbury rugby league team players
Marist Saints players
Point Chevalier Pirates players
New Zealand national rugby league team players
New Zealand rugby league players
North Island rugby league team players
Place of birth missing
Rugby league locks
South Island rugby league team players
West Coast rugby league team players